Baker Boys: Inside the Surge, is a 2010 four-part documentary series following the soldiers of Baker Company, Task Force 1-15 Infantry, 3d Heavy Brigade Combat Team, 3rd Infantry Division, during their deployment in Operation Iraqi Freedom at Combat Outpost Carver during the troop surge of 2007.

Overview
The series provides an intimate view of counter-insurgency and soldiers on the front lines during the surge of coalition troops in Iraq. Beginning in February 2008, journalist Jon Steele embedded with Baker Company. Over the course of 90 days, he conducted interviews with its soldiers, filmed their activities, and gathered footage from ground and air combat missions.

This 4-part miniseries was directed by two-time Emmy Award winner Kern Konwiser and presented in association with Gigapix Studios, PointProd, and Sandbag Productions.

Premieres
Baker Boys: Inside the Surge was first aired in January 2010. Beginning on Jan. 4, HDNet aired it in four one-hour segments every Monday. The series was released for screening on April 23, 2010, at the Newport Beach Film Festival. On January 4, 2011, Baker Boys was released on DVD, initially exclusively through the Army and Air Force Exchange Service (AAFES). On Jan. 19 and 20, 2011, the National Infantry Museum's IMAX theater screened it for the Fort Benning community, home of the 1-15 Infantry.

Awards
Baker Boys: Inside the Surge has won awards at every festival in which it has been
played, including:

References

External links
 
 
 
 

2010s American documentary television series
2010 television films
2010 films
American war films
Documentary films about the Iraq War
Documentary television series about war
2010 independent films
American independent films
Iraq War in television
2010s English-language films
2010s American films